Aleksandr Yuryevich Krivoruchko (born 23 September 1984) is a Russian professional football coach and a former goalkeeper. He works at the academy of FC Lokomotiv Moscow.

Career
He was voted Lokomotiv-2 player of the year in 2009.  On 5 February 2010, Krivoruchko was promoted to the main team of Lokomotiv. On 21 December 2010, he left the club.

Krivoruchko signed for Fakel Voronezh in January 2014. On 2 July 2014, Krivoruchko signed a two-year contract with Anzhi Makhachkala.

Career statistics

References

External links
 

1984 births
Footballers from Moscow
Living people
Russian footballers
Russia under-21 international footballers
Association football goalkeepers
PFC Spartak Nalchik players
FC Salyut Belgorod players
FC Vityaz Podolsk players
FC Fakel Voronezh players
FC Anzhi Makhachkala players
Russian Premier League players
FC Tom Tomsk players
FC SKA-Khabarovsk players
FC Lokomotiv Moscow players
FC Orenburg players